Emilio Rosenblueth Deutsch (1926–1994) was a Mexican engineer who devoted himself to the research of seismic events, and in particular to study the behavior of buildings against earthquakes and other seismic activity.

Born in Mexico City, Rosenblueth was the only child of Emilio Rosenblueth Stearns and Charlotte Deutsch Kleinman. They came to Mexico from Hungary as refugees before he was born.

University Studies 
Emilio Rosenblueth grew up in a family of leading researchers, so from an early age he was inclined towards the sciences. He became interested in seismic phenomena due to the location of his hometown and its high propensity for earthquake activity. He began his university studies at the National Autonomous University of Mexico (UNAM for its name in Spanish) where he obtained a bachelor's degree in 1948. He received a master's degree in 1949 and a PhD in 1951 from the University of Illinois.

Content in this edit is translated from the existing Spanish Wikipedia article at Emilio Rosenlueth; see its history for attribution.

References

1926 births
1994 deaths
20th-century Mexican engineers
Engineers from Mexico City
National Autonomous University of Mexico alumni
Academic staff of the National Autonomous University of Mexico
Mexican people of German descent
TWAS fellows
Foreign associates of the National Academy of Sciences